Børge Hylle (30 May 1926 – 19 July 1990) was a Danish footballer. He played in two matches for the Denmark national football team in 1951.

References

External links
 

1926 births
1990 deaths
Danish men's footballers
Denmark international footballers
Place of birth missing
Association footballers not categorized by position